Frédéric Jay (born 20 September 1976) is a French professional football manager and former player. He is the head coach of Championnat National 2 club Louhans-Cuiseaux.

Managerial career 
Jay was the manager of Mâcon from 2015 to 2017. In 2018, he became the manager of Louhans-Cuiseaux.

References

External links
 

Living people
1976 births
Sportspeople from Mâcon
French footballers
Association football fullbacks
Ligue 1 players
Ligue 2 players
Belgian Pro League players
AJ Auxerre players
Stade Rennais F.C. players
R.A.E.C. Mons players
French football managers
UF Mâconnais managers
Louhans-Cuiseaux FC managers
Expatriate footballers in Belgium
French expatriate sportspeople in Belgium
French expatriate footballers
Footballers from Bourgogne-Franche-Comté